Sangsul Yi (Jincheon County, December 7, 1870 – Ussuriysk, April 1, 1917), also known as Yi Sang-seol, was a Korean civil servant and independence activist.

Life
Sangsul Yi was born in Jincheon (진천) in the province of Chungcheong and was sprung from a Yi Haeng-u's loin. He was famous for his brightness, so in 1876, at the age of 7, he was adopted into Yi Yong-u's family and he relocated to Seoul. In 1896, he became a professor of Seonggyungwan. 

In 1904, when the Empire of Japan demanded the reclamation right of wasteland, he made an appeal to the king to refuse that. In 1905, at that time of Japan–Korea Treaty of 1905, he made an appeal to the king to oppose the treaty and execute the Five Eulsa Traitors times. However, he left office and attempted suicide. 

From then on, he take the initiative in restoring national right and patriotic enlightenment movement. In 1907 he and his compatriots Yi Tjoune and Tjyongoui Yi were delegated by Emperor Gojong to attend the Second Hague Peace Conference in The Hague. He was commissioned to announce to the international community that Korea was an independent state and that the Japanese invasion was unlawful. The trio traveled for two months on the Trans-Siberian Railway to The Hague. 

The Korean delegation was not officially invited, although the Netherlands initially had planned. However, the Japanese government was able to step in and succeeded in convincing the other delegates of the conference not to let Korea participate. The mission had already failed. However, the three Koreans succeeded in receiving worldwide attention due to a press conference and receiving attention in an independent newspaper which covered the Peace Conference. The direct result of their mission was that the Korean Emperor, Gojong was forced to resign in favor of his son Sunjong. In 1910, Yi founded 13 douigun (13도의군), troops against Empire of Japan, with Yoo In-seok, Yi Beom-yun, Yi Nam-gi to united loyal troops and deploy more effective war against Japan. In 1917, at the age of 47, he died in Ussuriysk (at that time, name was Nikolsk). He left a will, and the contents of the will were to burn his body and keepsakes and don't perform ancestral rites. As per his will, he and his library was burnt.

After Death
In 1962, Government of South Korea conferred Order of Merit for National Foundation (Order of the President) in Yi to honor his meritorious deeds.

See also 
 Hague Secret Emissary Affair

References 

1870 births
1917 deaths
19th-century Korean people
20th-century Korean people
Hague Conventions of 1899 and 1907
Korean independence activists